Thai Rubber Latex Group is a manufacturer and exporter of latex concentrate, disposable rubber glove, extruded rubber thread, talcum coated rubber thread, and various rubber products.

References

Companies of Thailand
Companies established in 1985
Companies listed on the Stock Exchange of Thailand
1985 establishments in Thailand
Rubber industry